Charles Alistair Currey (born 6 November 1947) is a British sailor who competed in the 1972 Summer Olympics.

References

External links
 
 
 

1947 births
Living people
British male sailors (sport)
Olympic sailors of Great Britain
Sailors at the 1972 Summer Olympics – Dragon